Augustów (formerly known in English as Augustovo or Augustowo) is a town in north-eastern Poland. It lies on the Netta River and the Augustów Canal. It is situated in the Podlaskie Voivodeship (since 1999), having previously been located in Suwałki Voivodeship (1975–1998). It is the seat of Augustów County and of Gmina Augustów.

In 1970, Augustów became officially recognized as a health and relaxation resort. In 1973, surrounding settlements were named a part of it, forming a popular resort town.

History

A settlement in the area was first mentioned in 1496. Augustów was established around 1540 by Bona Sforza and granted Magdeburg rights in 1557 by Sigismund II Augustus, after whom it was also named. It was laid out in a very regular manner, with a spacious market-place.

Until 1569 Augustów belonged to the Grand Duchy of Lithuania. In 1569 it became part of the Crown of the Kingdom of Poland, while its cemetery was left in the Grand Duchy, both countries formed the Polish–Lithuanian Commonwealth as a result of the Union of Lublin. Augustów was a royal city, located in the Podlaskie Voivodeship in the Lesser Poland Province of the Polish Crown. Tatar invaders destroyed Augustów in 1656, and the second half of the 17th century saw the town afflicted by plague.

In 1795 Prussia annexed Augustów in the Third Partition of Poland. In 1807, it became part of the Duchy of Warsaw, followed by incorporation into the Russian-controlled Kingdom of Poland in 1815. It was made a county seat in 1842. The local populace took part in the large Polish January Uprising of 1863–1864 against Russia. Following Russia's full annexation of the Polish kingdom in the 1860s, it was administered from Suwałki. With a population around 9400, it carried a large trade in cattle and horses, and manufactured linen and huckaback. Its canal connects the Vistula and Neman rivers and the railway reached the town in 1899, when its population was around 12,800.

During World War I, the Russian Army successfully counterattacked the German Army in the Battle of Augustów, in the lead-up to the better-known Battle of the Vistula River. In the aftermath of World War I, it was a site of fighting during the Battle of Augustów in 1920. 

Following the joint German-Soviet invasion of Poland, which started World War II in September 1939, Augustów was occupied by the Soviet Union until 1941. Many inhabitants were sent to exile in Kazakhstan, from where some were able to return after 6 years. On June 22, 1941, just before the Germans captured the town, the Soviets murdered around 30–34 Polish prisoners in Augustów as part of the NKVD prisoner massacres. The Nazi German forces occupied Augustów until 1944, and operated a forced labour camp in the town. World War II brought the destruction of about 70% of the town and death or departure of most of its residents, amongst them a community of several thousand Jews who were imprisoned in the ghetto situated between the canal and the river. The Germans executed practically all of them before they left. In 1945 the Soviets conducted the nearby Augustów roundup – a special operation against former Armia Krajowa anticommunist fighters.

Demographics

Transport

Road transport
National roads 8 (Kudowa-Zdrój–Budzisko), 16 (Dolna Grupa–Ogrodniki and 61 (Warsaw–Augustów), as well as voivodeship roads 664 (Augustów–Lipszczany) and 672 (Augustów–Suwałki) pass through the town.

Augustów ring road controversy
The construction of the Augustów bypass called Via Baltica, through the wetlands of the Rospuda Valley, attracted great controversy in 2007. The work was halted after the European Commission applied for an immediate injunction.

Rail transport
Railway line 40 (Sokółka–Suwałki) passes through the town. Augustów has a railway station.

Tourism

The town, although small, has many attractions for the visitors. Oficerski Yacht Club Hotel, built in the 1930s, is an army yacht club that has been restored and converted into a resort. It is located on the edge of one of many lakes in the region. Pope John Paul II has a memorial chair from the first and last time he visited the town right outside the club. Boat tours are also popular and the old town square still has its original cobblestone streets.

Every year hundreds of bikers come to Augustowskie Motonoce bikers festival. Bands that over years participated in celebration include , AGE, ZZ Top Czech Revival Band, AC/DC Show Ukraina, Kraków Street Band, etc.

Cuisine
Among the popular traditional dishes of north-eastern Poland, including Augustów, are kartacze and potato babka. Popular regional cakes are sękacz and mrowisko (lit. transl. "anthill"). Officially protected traditional foods from Augustów and its surroundings include the Augustów honey (miód augustowski) which comes in several variants, and augustowska jagodzianka, a local yeast roll stuffed with blueberries and topped with streusel, a popular dessert.

Sports

International relations

Twin towns – sister cities
Augustów is twinned with:

  Druskininkai, Lithuania (2007)
  Porto Ceresio, Italy (2003)
  Rudky, Ukraine (2011)
  Supraśl, Poland (2012)
  Tuusula, Finland (1996)

Former twin towns
  Grodno, Belarus (2008–2022)
  Slonim, Belarus (2013–2022)
On 7 March 2022, partnership with Belarusian cities was terminated due to Belarus's involvement in the 2022 Russian invasion of Ukraine.

Notable residents
 Edyta Dzieniszewska (born 1986), sprint canoer
 Joanna Fiodorow (born 1989), hammer thrower
 Jan Jaworowski (1923–2013), mathematician
 Zbigniew Kundzewicz (born 1950), hydrologist and climatologist
 Emil Leon Post (1897–1954), mathematician and logician
 Andrzej Sobolewski (born 1951), physicist
 Rose Pastor Stokes (1879–1933) American socialist activist, writer, birth control advocate, and feminist.
 Adam Wysocki (born 1974), sprint canoer
 Marek Zalewski (born 1963), archbishop

See also

 Augustów Canal
 1st Krechowce Uhlan Regiment

References

External links

  
 Jewish community of Augustów on Virtual Shtetl

Augustów County
Belastok Region
Białystok Voivodeship (1919–1939)
Cities and towns in Podlaskie Voivodeship
Holocaust locations in Poland
Jewish communities destroyed in the Holocaust
Spa towns in Poland
Suwałki Governorate